The Filmfare Best Male Playback Singer Award is given by Indian film magazine Filmfare as a part of its annual Filmfare Awards for Hindi films, to recognise a male playback singer who has delivered an outstanding performance in a film song.

Although the Filmfare Awards started in 1954, awards for the best playback singer category started in 1959. From inception of the category through 1967, both the female and male singers used to compete for a single award, after which separate categories were created for female and male singers respectively.

Superlatives

 Kishore Kumar won the award the maximum number of times 8 in this category, whereas Mohammad Rafi & Arijit Singh won it 6 times each. Kumar Sanu & Udit Narayan have won the award 5 times each. Mukesh has won this award four times. Mahendra Kapoor has won it thrice.
 Mohammad Rafi dominated the 60's with 5 wins. Kishore Kumar, Mukesh had the highest win during 70's winning the award 3 times each. Kishore Kumar continued domination during 80's with 5 wins. Kumar Sanu with most 5 consecutive wins from 1990 to 1995. Udit Narayan, Sonu Nigam and Shaan sharing 2 awards among each other in 2000s. Arijit Singh dominated 2010's with 5 wins.
 Kishore Kumar has the most nominations (28), followed by Mohammad Rafi (21) and Udit Narayan (20). Arijit Singh (18), Sonu Nigam (17), Mukesh (14) & Kumar Sanu (14) among others.
 Udit Narayan holds a unique record of receiving nominations in this category in 3 different decades (1980s, 1990s and 2000s) and getting award in all 3 different decades also the only singer of different origin (Nepali) to win 5 times till date. Arijit Singh (2016-2020) & Kumar Sanu (1991-1995) holds the record for most consecutive wins, five times in a row. Coincidentally, the songs for which Kumar Sanu won the awards, their music also won the Filmfare Award for Best Music Director. Kishore Kumar won the award four times in a row from 1983 to 1986.
 Mukesh is the only playback singer who won this award posthumously (1977).
 Himesh Reshammiya became the first music director to win this award in 2006.
 Two singers have achieved the feat of receiving all the nominations of this category in a particular year: Mohammed Rafi was the single nominee in 1969, having all the three nominations to his credit, while Kishore Kumar was the single nominee in 1985, having all the four nominations to his credit. Incidentally, Kishore Kumar's all nominated songs were from a single movie, Sharaabi.

Most wins

Most consecutive wins

Multiple nominees

Winners and nominees

1950s
Note: The category for Best Playback Singer was established in 1959, and until 1967 both male and female singers used to compete for a single award.

1960s

1970s

1980s

1990s

2000s

2010s

2020s

See also
 Filmfare Award for Best Female Playback Singer
 Filmfare Awards
 Bollywood
 Cinema of India

External links
 Filmfare Nominees and Winners
Filmfare Best Male Playback Singer

Male Playback
Indian music awards